The Revolution of the King and the People was a Moroccan anti-colonial national liberation movement to end the French Protectorate and break free from the French colonial empire. The name refers to coordination between the Moroccan monarch Sultan Muhammad V and the popular  in efforts against colonialism and toward independence, particularly after the French authorities forced Sultan Muhammad V into exile on August 20, 1953—Eid al-Adha. August 20 is observed as a national holiday in Morocco in remembrance of the Revolution of the King and the People.

Context 
Following the French Bombardment of Casablanca and French conquest of Morocco, the Treaty of Fes of 1912 officially made Morocco a protectorate of France. The Istiqlal Party was created December 1943, and it issued the Proclamation of Independence of Morocco January 11, 1944.

History

Tangier Speech 

After French authorities failed in their attempt to disrupt his journey with the Massacre of April 7, 1947, Sultan Muhammad V spoke out demanding Morocco's independence for the first time in a historic and symbolic trip to the Tangier International Zone, where he delivered the Tangier Speech of April 9, 1947. In the words of the historian Susan Gilson Miller:The shy and retiring Muhammad V rose up like a lion to meet his historical destiny. In an electric speech pronounced at Tangier on April 9, 1947, the sultan – who had never before uttered a word that might suggest he would deviate from Protectorate policy – praised the march toward Moroccan “unity” and affirmed his belief in the country’s 'Arabo-Islamic' destiny, publicly carving out a wide space between himself and the Residency. Carefully modulating his language, the sultan now joined the duel between the Istiqlal and the Protectorate regime, turning it into a three-sided altercation. The popularity of the sultan and his family soared, as “monarchy fever” seized the Moroccan people and Muhammad V became the adored symbol of the nation. His portrait appeared everywhere, in the smallest shops of the madina to the place of honor inside the private home.

Mounting pressure 
The assassination of the Tunisian labor unionist Farhat Hached by La Main Rouge—the clandestine militant wing of French foreign intelligence—sparked protests in cities around the world and riots in Casablanca, especially in the bidonville Carrières Centrales (now Hay Mohammadi), from 7–8 December 1952. Approximately 100 people were killed.

Exile of Sultan Muhammad V 
On August 20, 1953—Eid al-Adha—Amir al-Mu'minin ("Commander of the Faithful") Sultan Muhammad V was deposed and exiled—first to Corsica, then to Madagascar.

Armed resistance 
After the sultan's exile, popular resistance became more aggressive. On September 11, 1953, Allal ben Abdallah attempted to assassinate Mohammed Ben Aarafa, the puppet monarch imposed by the French. On December 24, 1953—Christmas Eve—the Moroccan nationalist Muhammad Zarqtuni bombed Casablanca's Central Market, frequented by the European colonists.

France responded with airplanes, tanks, and ground troops, bringing some from French Indochina. Following the example of Algeria's National Liberation Front (FLN), the Moroccan Nationalist Movement created a paramilitary force—Jish Etteḥrir, the Moroccan Army of Liberation—led by Abbas Messaadi in the north of Morocco October 1955.

Independence 
Under pressure and having lost control of the country, the French authorities removed Ben Arafa and were forced to negotiate with exiled Sultan Muhammad V. The negotiations at the Conference of Aix-les-Bains with "representatives of Moroccan public opinion" took place August 22, 1955, but these were largely ineffective. Further negotiations took place in Antsirabe in September. In October, a plan was made including a temporary "Throne Council" of loyalists to France, such as Muhammad al-Muqri, but this idea was rejected right away by the Istiqlal Party and general opinion in the Moroccan streets.

From Paris, Muhammad V addressed Morocco, promising reforms to bring the country toward "a democratic state based on a constitutional monarchy." Muslims gathered in the mosques the following Friday to hear Muhammad V's Friday sermon, while national council of Moroccan rabbis met in Rabat and issued a declaration of joy.

On November 16, 1955, Muhammad V arrived in Morocco and announced end of the French Protectorate in Morocco, announcing the end of the "minor jihad" of securing independence and the beginning of the "major jihad" of collectively building the new Morocco. Negotiations between France and Morocco continued in February and March 1956, with the former suggesting that Morocco become "an independent state united with France by permanent ties of interdependency" while the latter pushed for a complete annulment of the Treaty of Fes of 1912. The Franco-Moroccan Declaration of Independence was signed March 2, 1956, although about 100,000 French troops remained on Moroccan land at the time.

Spain signed an agreement with Morocco April 1956 to leave the northern zone, but it did not withdraw its forces from Tarfaya and Sidi Ifni in the Sahara for another 20 years, while Ceuta and Melilla remain in Spanish hands to this day.

On October 8, 1956, an international conference in Fedala was convened to handle the restitution of Tangier.

After Independence 
Revolution of the King and the People is celebrated yearly by the Moroccans and their King. Every year on August 20, the King delivers a Royal speech on national television.

References 

Anti-imperialism in Africa
Revolutions
History of Morocco
'Alawi dynasty
1940s conflicts
1950s conflicts
Conflicts in Africa
20th-century revolutions
Decolonization
History of Africa